Mineral Wells or similar may refer to:

Places in the United States
Mineral Well Park, Petoskey, Michigan
Mineral Wells, Mississippi, an unincorporated community
Mineral Wells, Texas, a town of about 15,000
Mineral Wells Airport
Mineral Wells Independent School District
Mineral Wells, an area including a picnic area in north Griffith Park, Los Angeles, California
Mineralwells, West Virginia

Other
Mineral Wells Formation, a geologic formation in Texas
Mineral Wells Index, a former newspaper in Texas
Mineral Wells Resorters, a baseball team in Texas in the 1920s